Basketball at the 2010 Summer Youth Olympics took place at the *scape Youth Space in Singapore.

Participating teams

Preliminary round

Group A

Group B

Group C

Group D

Placement games

17th–20th
This round will be contested by the 5th-place finishers of each group to compete for 17th to 20th positions.

9th–16th

13th–16th

15th place playoff

13th place playoff

9th–12th

11th place playoff

9th place playoff

Final round
This stage will be contested by the top 2 teams from each group to compete for 1st to 8th positions.

Quarter-finals

5th–8th

7th place playoff

5th place playoff

Semifinals

Bronze-medal game

Final

Final standings

References
 Tournament Summary

Girls' Tournament
2010 in women's basketball
International women's basketball competitions hosted by Singapore